The 2022 NCAA Men's Gymnastics Championships was held from April 15–16, 2022 at the Lloyd Noble Center in Norman, Oklahoma.

National qualifier sessions

Session 1
The first national qualifier session of the 2022 NCAA Men's Gymnastics Championships took place on April 15, 2022. The following teams competed in Session 1.
No. 1 Stanford
No, 4 Nebraska
No. 6 Illinois
No. 8 Penn State
No. 9 California
No. 12 Springfield

Session 2
The second national qualifier session of the 2021 NCAA Men's Gymnastics Championships took place on April 15, 2021. The following teams competed in Session 2.
No. 2 Oklahoma
No. 3 Michigan
No. 5 Ohio State
No. 7 Navy
No. 10 Air Force
No. 11 Army

NCAA Championship
The top three teams from each session advanced to the National Championship.

Standings
National Champion: Stanford – 423.628
2nd Place: Oklahoma – 414.555
3rd Place: Michigan – 414.490

Results

Individual event finals
The top-three all-around competitors and top-three individuals on each event who are not members of one of the qualifying teams advanced from each pre-qualifying session to the finals session to compete for individual titles. Finals competition took place on April 16.

Medalists

References

NCAA Men's Gymnastics championship
2022 in American sports
NCAA Men's Gymnastics Championship
Sports competitions in Oklahoma